Mitogen-activated protein kinase kinase kinase 4 is an enzyme that in humans is encoded by the MAP3K4 gene.

The central core of each mitogen-activated protein kinase (MAPK) pathway is a conserved cascade of 3 protein kinases: an activated MAPK kinase kinase (MAPKKK) phosphorylates and activates a specific MAPK kinase (MAPKK), which then activates a specific MAPK. While the ERK MAPKs are activated by mitogenic stimulation, the CSBP2 (p38α) and JNK MAPKs are activated by environmental stresses such as osmotic shock, UV irradiation, wound stress, and inflammatory factors. This gene encodes a MAPKKK, the MEKK4 protein, also called MTK1. This protein contains a protein kinase catalytic domain at the C terminus. The N-terminal nonkinase domain may contain a regulatory domain. Expression of MEKK4 in mammalian cells activated the CSBP2 (p38α) and JNK MAPK pathways, but not the ERK pathway. In vitro kinase studies indicated that recombinant MEKK4 can specifically phosphorylate and activate PRKMK6 (MKK6) and SERK1 (MKK4), MAPKKs that activate CSBP2 (p38α) and JNK, respectively but cannot phosphorylate PRKMK1 (MKK1), an MAPKK that activates ERKs. MEKK4 is a major mediator of environmental stresses that activate the p38 MAPK pathway, and a minor mediator of the JNK pathway. Two alternatively spliced transcripts encoding distinct isoforms have been described.

Interactions
MAP3K4 has been shown to interact with GADD45G, GADD45B and GADD45A.

References

Further reading

EC 2.7.11